Gravesteiniella is a genus of true bugs belonging to the family Delphacidae.

The species of this genus are found in Europe.

Species:
 Gravesteiniella boldi (Scott, 1870) 
 Gravesteiniella deminuta Emeljanov, 1972

References

Delphacidae